Eleonora Masalab (October 12, 1988) is a Ukrainian beauty pageant contestant and winner of Miss Ukraine Universe 2008.

She represented Ukraine in Miss Universe 2008, which took place in Vietnam, on July 14, 2008.  She did not place in the top 15.  She was previously the runner-up in Miss Model of the World 2005–2006, and competed in Miss Ukraine 2007.

References 

Miss Universe 2008 contestants
1988 births
Living people
Ukrainian beauty pageant winners
Ukrainian female models